The Carlisle Indians football team competed in the highest level of competition in college football during its 25 seasons of play from 1893 until 1917, representing the Carlisle Indian Industrial School. The team's all-time record or 173–91–13, a .648 winning percentage, is the best record of any major defunct college football team.

Seasons

References

Further reading

 

Lists of college football seasons
Pennsylvania sports-related lists